Erwin Roy John (August 14, 1924 – February 28, 2009) was a pioneer in the field of quantitative electroencephalography and neurometrics.

Chronology 
Erwin (E.) Roy John was born in Brownsville, Pennsylvania, United States. During the Great Depression he was a union organizer in an airplane plant. His attendance at City College of New York was interrupted by World War II, where he volunteered and served in the Battle of the Bulge. After the war, he attended University of Chicago earning a BA in physics and a PhD in psychology. He began work on brain research at UCLA and later founded brain research laboratories at the University of Rochester and at Flower Fifth Avenue Hospital. He was also a professor of psychiatry at NYU and a research scientist at the Nathan S. Kline Institute for Psychiatric Research. His work led to more than 25 patents in medical technology.

Neurometrics and other research 
The field of neurometrics was invented by Dr. John. He also did fundamental work on memory, originating the idea that memory was distributed throughout the brain.

He was a developer of quantitative electroencephalography (QEEG) and, together with his colleagues, developed algorithms that let QEEG be used to measure many psychological and mental problems.

Brain Research Laboratories 
Dr. John founded Brain Research Laboratories at NYU School of Medicine in 1974. He served as its director for over 30 years. Research he led at BRL led to advances in the diagnosis and treatment of coma, learning disabilities, autism and brain injury from blast damage or repeated concussion.

Politics 
Dr. John was interested in politics from childhood; in college, he founded a group to oppose McCarthyism; he was involved in the opposition to the Vietnam War and made frequent visits to Cuba.

Bibliography

References 

City College of New York alumni
University of Chicago alumni
1924 births
2009 deaths
American neuroscientists
New York University faculty
American military personnel of World War II